Houston Markham Jr. (c. 1944 – July 17, 2019) was an American football player and coach. He served as the head football coach at Alabama State University from 1987 to 1997, compiling a record of 69–47–4. His 1991 squad was named the black college football national champion. Markham died on July 17, 2019, at the age of 75.

Head coaching record

College

References

Year of birth missing
1940s births
2019 deaths
Alabama State Hornets football coaches
Alcorn State Braves football players
High school football coaches in Mississippi
Jackson State Tigers football coaches
People from Brookhaven, Mississippi
Players of American football from Mississippi
African-American coaches of American football
African-American players of American football
20th-century African-American sportspeople
21st-century African-American sportspeople